Telephium are a genus of flowering plants in the family Molluginaceae or Caryophyllaceae, found in Mediterranean parts of Europe, Africa, the Arabian Peninsula, and western Asia. They are annual or perennial herbs, sometimes becoming woody at their bases. Together with Corrigiola they form the tribe Corrigioleae.

The generic name is derived from a Greek word for a plant thought to be a symbol of reciprocated love ("far-off-lover").

Species
Currently accepted species include:

Telephium barbeyanum Bornm.
Telephium eriglaucum F.N.Williams
Telephium imperati L.
Telephium oligospermum Steud. ex Boiss.
Telephium sphaerospermum Boiss.

References

Molluginaceae
Caryophyllales genera